Sunshine on Leith may refer to:
 Sunshine on Leith (album), a 1988 album by the Proclaimers
 Sunshine on Leith (song), title track from the above album
 Sunshine on Leith (musical), a 2007 musical based on the music of the Proclaimers
 Sunshine on Leith (film), a 2013 film based on the musical